Tiger Warsaw is a 1988 American drama film directed by Amin Q. Chaudhri, written by Roy London, starring Patrick Swayze. It was produced by Continental Film Group.

Plot

Chuck "Tiger" Warsaw (Swayze) brought sorrow to his family fifteen years earlier when he shot his father Michael (Lee Richardson) and made him a semi-invalid.  After fifteen years of self-destruction, Tiger returns home to the steel production community of Sharon to seek forgiveness.

Cast
Patrick Swayze as Chuck "Tiger" Warsaw
Piper Laurie as Frances Warsaw
Lee Richardson as Michael Warsaw
Mary McDonnell as Paula Warsaw
Barbara Williams as Karen
Bobby DiCicco as Tony
Jenny Chrisinger as Val
James Patrick Gillis as Roger
Michelle Glaven as Emily
Kevin Bayer as Robin
Beeson Carroll as Uncle Gene
Sally-Jane Heit as Aunt Barbara
Kaye Ballard as Aunt Thelma
Thomas Mills Wood as Lt. Fontana
Cynthia Lammel as Paula's secretary
Steve Jaklic as Kid in Womb

Production
The outside of the "Buhl Mansion" in the film was actually the Buhl Casino founded in the early 1910s by Frank H. Buhl on his 300-acre farm that he turned into a park and donated it to the people of the Shenango Valley for families to come and enjoy.

Tagline
The film was advertised with the tagline "Years ago he shattered his life.  Now he's back to pick up the pieces."

Reception
The film only grossed $422,667 in the United States upon its spring 1988 release.

References

External links

1988 films
1988 drama films
1988 independent films
American drama films
American independent films
Films about families
Films set in Pennsylvania
Mercer County, Pennsylvania
Sony Pictures films
1980s English-language films
1980s American films